Quaid Software, Ltd. was a software publisher based in Toronto, Ontario. The company's best known product was Copywrite which company president Robert McQuaid claimed was "for making legal backup copies of a protected program." 

The company was the subject to a lawsuit claiming that the software was used for making illegal copies.   The lawsuit was dismissed because Section 117 of the US Copyright Act specifically allows:
 the new copy is being made for archival (i.e., backup) purposes only;
 you are the legal owner of the copy; and
 any copy made for archival purposes is either destroyed, or transferred with the original copy, once the original copy is sold, given away, or otherwise transferred.
The Court concluded that, because of federal copyright law, its provisions (Louisiana License Act) were preempted (by the US Copyright Act) and Vault's license agreement was unenforceable.

See also 
 Vault Corp. v. Quaid Software Ltd.

References

See also
Vault Corp. v. Quaid Software Ltd.

Companies based in Toronto
Software companies of Canada